The Rolle Pass (1989 m) is a high mountain pass in Trentino in Italy.

It connects the Fiemme and Primiero valleys, and the communities of Predazzo, San Martino di Castrozza and Fiera di Primiero. The pass road was built between 1863 and 1874, when the area still belonged to Austria. The pass lies within the Parco Naturale Paneveggio - Pale di San Martino.

See also
 List of highest paved roads in Europe
 List of mountain passes

Rolle